Alison Marion Lohman (born September 18, 1979) is an American retired actress.

Lohman began her career with small roles in short and independent films, and had a breakthrough as the star of the drama film White Oleander (2002), which earned her recognition and a Young Hollywood Award. She earned praise for her performances in the fantasy film Big Fish (2003) and the dark comedy film Matchstick Men (2003), winning a Hollywood Film Award for Best Supporting Actress for the latter. She lent her voice to the animated film Nausicaä of the Valley of the Wind (2005) and starred in the sitcom Tucker (2000–2001) before taking a role in the soap opera Pasadena (2001–2002).

Lohman sporadically worked in acting throughout the late 2000s, notably playing roles in the action film Beowulf (2007) and the drama film Things We Lost in the Fire (2007). Her highest-grossing film came with the horror film Drag Me to Hell (2009), which earned her nominations for the Detroit Film Critics Society Award for Best Actress, the Saturn Award for Best Actress, and the MTV Movie Award for Best Scared-As-Shit Performance. She then retired from acting following her marriage to filmmaker Mark Neveldine later that year, stating that she wanted to teach online acting classes while focusing on raising their three children. She has since had small roles in Neveldine's films The Vatican Tapes (2015), Urge (2016), and Officer Downe (2016).

Early life
Alison Marion Lohman was born in Palm Springs, California, on September 18, 1979, the daughter of pâtisserie owner Diane (née Dunham) and Minnesota-born architect Gary Lohman. She has a younger brother named Robert. She excelled in high school, obtaining top grades in all subjects except drama because she suffered from shyness. During her senior year, she was awarded the National Foundation for Advancement in the Arts. She was offered a full scholarship to attend New York University but declined, opting instead to directly pursue an acting career.

Career 

At age nine, Lohman played Gretl in The Sound of Music at the Palm Desert's McCallum Theater. Two years later, she won the Desert Theater League's award for Most Outstanding Actress in a Musical for the title role in Annie. She went on to perform locally as a child singer, which included alongside Frank Sinatra at a benefit event in Palm Springs. She moved to Los Angeles in 1997 to pursue an acting career, beginning with minor roles in independent films and B movies. She was set to play a cancer patient in Tom Shadyac's 2002 film Dragonfly, for which Lohman shaved her hair. Her scenes were later removed.

Lohman was subsequently cast in White Oleander, an adaptation of Janet Fitch's novel, which was directed by Peter Kosminsky. Due to her previous haircut, she had to wear a wig during filming. Released in 2002, White Oleander earned positive reviews, and Lohman's performance was met with widespread acclaim. It was described as her "breakthrough role" by media sources, with the New York Times describing her work as "the year's most auspicious screen acting début". She additionally earned praise for her roles in Matchstick Men, released in 2003, and Big Fish, also released in 2003. Matchstick Men earned Lohman's performance as an adolescent con-artist acclaim over her co-star Nicolas Cage, while Big Fish saw her playing the younger version of Jessica Lange's character, for which USA Today wrote that "equally delightful is the Alison Lohman character's evolution into an older woman. It's a metamorphosis to equal any in screen history."

In 2005, Lohman appeared in Atom Egoyan's Where the Truth Lies which originally received an NC-17 rating for its graphic sexual content, and emerged as a critical and commercial failure. Some critics, notably Roger Ebert, felt that Lohman was miscast. Her next feature of that year, The Big White, was also panned by critics. Better received was the English language dubbing of Nausicaä of the Valley of the Wind, also released in 2005, in which she voiced the titular character. Lohman beat out actress Natalie Portman for the role. The film was lauded by critics and audiences alike, and had a considerable impact on popular culture.

Lohman's next film was the drama Flicka, which was released in 2006. At the age of 25, she played a 16-year-old girl who befriends a wild mustang in the film. She had trained rigorously in horse-riding for the role, stating she was "constantly thrown emotionally and physically" while working with the horses for this role. She next played a recovering heroin addict in Things We Lost in the Fire, which was released in 2007 to mostly positive reviews. She had a role in 2009's Gamer, which was heavily criticized by critics.

Lohman starred in Sam Raimi's 2009 horror film Drag Me to Hell, taking the role after Elliot Page dropped out due to scheduling conflicts. Lohman enjoyed her stunts during filming, despite not being particularly fond of horror films. The film grossed $90 million worldwide, becoming her highest-grossing role and garnering praise for her performance. In his review of the film, Roger Ebert wrote that she "greatly assisted" in the film's success and labeled her a scream queen: "It is essential that the heroine be a good screamer, and man, can that Alison Lohman scream. Stanley Kubrick would have needed only a day with her on The Shining." She received nominations for the Detroit Film Critics Society Award for Best Actress, the Saturn Award for Best Actress, and the MTV Movie Award for Best Scared-As-Shit Performance.

Following her role in Drag Me to Hell, Lohman retired from acting in 2009, citing her recent marriage to filmmaker Mark Neveldine and her desire to focus on raising their three children. She has since taught online acting classes and had small roles in three of Neveldine's films.

Personal life
In 2009, Lohman married filmmaker Mark Neveldine at St. Anthony's Catholic Church in Watertown, New York. They have three children.

Filmography

Film

Television

Stage

Accolades

References

External links

1979 births
Living people
20th-century American actresses
21st-century American actresses
American acting coaches
Actresses from Palm Springs, California
Alumni of RADA
American child actresses
American film actresses
American stage actresses
American television actresses
American voice actresses